This is the list of characters in the 1987 Kamen Rider Series,  and its 1988 sequel .

Main characters

Kotaro Minami
 is a 19-year-old man who became a mutant cyborg called the  after the Gorgom captured him and his stepbrother Nobuhiko. Both are kidnapped for the sake of turning them into the Century Kings by having  them compete for the right of succeeding the Creation King and command Gorgom to rule the world, but just as his memories were about to be erased, Kotaro manages to escape. Since then, using the power of the Vital Charger belt and the King Stone of the Sun, he transforms into Kamen Rider Black to stop Gorgom and attempt to rescue Nobuhiko from them. He is referred by Gorgom as "Black Sun".

As Kamen Rider Black, Kotaro fights barehanded using Rider Punches and Kicks to finish his enemies, although he once wields Shadow Moon's weapon, the Satan Saber, for his final battle against the Creation King. He also uses two motorcycles during the series:
: A living motorcycle created by Gorgom, made specifically for the next Creation King. Used by Black during the series, it is temporarily hijacked by Shadow Moon once he is chosen by the Creation King as his true successor, but is destroyed by him once it manages to break free of his control and rejoin Black's side. It is later revived as Acrobatter when Kotaro evolves into Black RX.
: Black's secondary motorcycle originally created by Yoichi Daimon for Gorgom before he defects from the organization. Yoichi's son Akira Daimon lends it to Kotaro until the end of his fight against Gorgom.

During the events of Black RX, Kotaro lives with the Sahara Family and is captured by the Crisis Empire who ask him to join their side. When Kotaro refuses, they shatter his King Stone into two pieces, thus rendering him unable to transform into Kamen Rider Black. They throw him into outer space, where the sun's radiation mutated his King Stone, allowing him to evolve into Kamen Rider Black RX to fight the Crisis Empire and the Strange Demon Soldiers.

As Kamen Rider Black RX, Kotaro is armed with the  rapier, which allows him to perform the  finisher. During the series, he gains two additional forms:
In this form, he is armed with the  pistol, which allows him to perform the  finisher.
In this form, he is armed with the  sword, which allows him to perform the  finisher.

Like his previous form, Black RX has two different vehicles at his disposal:
: Battle Hopper's upgraded form, created once Kotaro evolves from Black to Black RX which subsequently triggers its resurrection. Unlike its previous form, it is capable of speaking with its owner.
: A car created by Kotaro using some blueprints given to him by Prof. Walter, a scientist in one of the colonies the Crisis Empire set up. It is also the first car used as a vehicle by a Kamen Rider and was the sole exception until Kamen Rider Drive 25 years later.

Nobuhiko Akizuki
 was born on the day of a solar eclipse alongside his stepbrother Kotaro Minami, revered by the Gorgom as the heirs to their leader's throne: the Century Kings "Shadow Moon" and "Black Sun". Raised together, the two were like brothers. Once the two were of the ideal age, Gorgom captured them and infused them each with a King Stone. While Kotaro manages to escape with his memory intact, Nobuhiko was turned completely  into a Batta Mutant with his mind wiped clean while left in a comatose state on life support before being finally reborn as Shadow Moon through the Stones of Earth, Heaven, and Sea. Shadow Moon sets up his regime as a general of Gorgom, serving as Black's nemesis and forcing him to fight him so he can become the new Creation King. In their final battle, Shadow Moon is weakened by Kamen Rider Black after the Satan Saber is used to slash his King Stone. Though he appears to die after being left inside the Gorgom headquarters when it explodes, Shadow Moon returns years later to seek revenge against Kotaro, who is now Black RX. However, he lost all of his memories related to Gorgom after its destruction. He is finally defeated by Black RX when he thrust the Revolcane through Shadow Moon's King Stone, destroying it once more. He turns back into Nobuhiko, renouncing his evil ways as he saved two children trapped in the explosive lava, shortly before he dies.

 The  is Shadow Moon's transformation belt. Through this stone, Shadow Moon can telepathically communicate with Kotaro via his own King Stone.

 The  is a weapon created for use by the Century Kings. Though Bilgenia took it, Shadow Moon reclaimed the weapon and took it as his own. He lost it to Black during their final battle.

 The  are a pair of long and short swords manifested by the King Stone. These weapons were used as a replacement for the Satan Saber.

  is a living motorcycle created by Gorgom, made specifically for the upcoming Creation Kings Black Sun and Shadow Moon. Battle Hopper was later stolen by Shadow Moon via his Shadow Flash before Black used his King Stone Flash to free him from Shadow Moon. As a result, Shadow Moon attacks Battle Hopper with the Satan Saber and the Bike soon dies.

In the series reboot, Kamen Rider Black Sun, Nobuhiko was turned into a Migratory Locust Kaijin alongside Kotaro by their fathers after the Second World War. During the 70s, falling in love with a human named Yukari Shinjou who sought equality between their peoples, Nobuhiko aided the Gorgom Party in the kidnapping of Shinichi Donami before it fell apart and was incarcerated in complex where he is interrogated on the whereabouts of the Kingstones while force-fed Heaven made from Yukari's remains. In the present, Nobuhiko escapes and plots his revenge on the Gorgom party before Shinichi reveals that Yukari was a government agent his grandfather assigned to acquire the Kingstones. The revelation drives Nobuhiko over the edge and fully awakens as a Century King, changing his plans to convert the Gorgom Party into a supremacist group under his leadership with aspirations of creating an utopia for Kaijin as the new Creation King.

Shadow Moon also appears in crossover films Kamen Rider × Super Sentai: Super Hero Taisen as a member of Dai Shocker and Kamen Rider × Super Sentai × Space Sheriff: Super Hero Taisen Z as a leading figure in Space Shocker.

Black characters

Kyoko Akizuki
 is Nobuhiko's younger sister, targeted a number of times by the High Priests as her life force could awaken Shadow Moon. At first she was not aware of Kotaro being Black himself until his fight to save her from the clutches of Bilgenia. Once Nobuhiko emerges as Shadow Moon, she and Katsumi are terrified of his new appearance as she eagerly refuses his offer to join him in making a new world without violence. After the defeat of Black at the hands of Shadow Moon, she and Katsumi left Japan to start a new life abroad. However, when Katsumi heard the news about Black's revival, Kyoko attempts to return to Japan to see Kotaro again.

Katsumi Kida
 is Nobuhiko's girlfriend, like Kyoko she is not aware of Kotaro being Black himself until Kyoko tells her the truth about Kotaro. Once Nobuhiko emerges as Shadow Moon, she was also terrified of his new appearance. After the defeat of Black at the hands of Shadow Moon, she and Kyoko left Japan to start a new life abroad.

Soichiro Akizuki
 is an archaeologist and friend of Kotaro's father. Soichiro joined Gorgom to financially support his archaeological projects. He is the father of Nobuhiko and Kyoko and became the foster father of Kotaro when his parents were killed by Gorgom through an accident. He was assassinated by Gorgom for disobeying their orders, for he realized that they were an organization of evil.

Soichiro Akizuki is portrayed by Kantaro Suga.

Masaru Todo
 is Kotaro's senior at the university who owns the Capitola bar shop where Kyoko and Katsumi work part-time.

Ryusuke Taki
 is a Special Agent from America who helped Kotaro in bad situations. He had been Nobuhiko's senior in soccer and taught him a technique called the Dragon Shot. Kotaro would learn this technique later on as well and use it as Black. He is aware of Kotaro's identity as Black.

 guest stars as Ryusuke Taki in episodes 16 & 30.

Kujira Mutant
 is a blue whale Mutant able to emit sticky foam from his blowhole and use a sonic attack. Unlike the others members of Gorgom, the Kujira Mutant was concerned for the oceans after overhearing Baraom and Darom talking about Gorgom's rise to power and that they might pollute the oceans, so he rebelled as a result. Recruited by Baraom to defeat Black, the Kujira Mutant overpowered Black when Baraom arrived to take his King Stone. But learning the Mutant's intent, Baraom attempted to kill the Mutant along with Black. As a result, the Kujira Mutant became an ally of Kamen Rider Black before retreating into the sea. Upon learning of Black's defeat, the Kujira Mutant searched the ocean and found his body, using a revival ceremony of his clan within his cave home to bring him back to life. Darom and the Komori Mutant then went after the Kujira Mutant until Kotaro revived and came to his aid. However, the Kujira Mutant was forced to turn himself in to Gorgom to save a child's life. Darom used him as bait for Black, only for the Kujira Mutant to help Black defeat Darom. Though still wounded from the Kōmori Mutant's attack, the Kujira Mutant guides Black to the cave that is Gorgom's Shrine before being attacked by the Togeuo Mutant. Kotaro catches up as the Togeuo Mutant starts to overwhelm Kujira Mutant but is forced to the Creation King's palace with the Kujira Mutant telling Black to protect the oceans before he died. The Kujira Mutant's cave would later serve to give life to Rideron before it caved in as a result.

RX characters

Reiko Shiratori
 is Kotaro's girlfriend who is a photographer, helping him before and after learning he is Black RX. After learning that Kotaro is Black RX, she begins to train herself in order fight Crisis' minions.

Sahara Family
The parents are murdered by Jark Midla in episode 46. Shigeru is the first person in the series to know that Kotaro is Black RX.

Joe the Haze
 is a master of the fighting style . He is one of Kotaro's closest friends and considered just as close as he was to Nobuhiko. Joe was originally a human from Earth who willingly allowed the Crisis Empire to convert him into a cyborg, losing all memory of his past and actual name. Under the control of Necksticker, Joe attacked Kotaro during his attempt to save Hitomi, becoming his ally once he regained his mind. He ended up injured by Bosgan during RX's fight with Gynagingam. He soon recovered and came back to help Kotaro.

Kyoko Matoba
 is an ESP girl who is skilled with a bow and can manipulate ground water. Her parents were murdered by the Crisis Empire monster Mundayganday, helping RX fight the Crisis Empire. Before specifically manipulating water, she was able to control all sorts of things in nature such as plants and rocks.

Goro
 is a chef who works at Sahara Airlines.

Hayato Hayamizu
 is an inspector who pursues Kotaro, believing he's a troublemaker. He was last seen knocked unconscious by Maribaron when she uses him to arrest Kotaro for her.

Ten veteran Kamen Riders
The original  are composed of  Kamen Riders 1 to ZX. They help Black RX in defeating the Crisis Empire. They appear at their base in the Arizona Desert in episodes 41-43 and help RX in episodes 44-47.

The appearance of the previous 10 Kamen Riders in the last 7 episodes of the series was their last in the franchise history, up until Kamen Rider Decade: All Riders vs. Dai-Shocker, not counting the remake versions of #1, #2 and V3 in recent movies Kamen Rider The First and Kamen Rider The Next.

Antagonists

Gorgom
The main villains from Kamen Rider Black,  is a criminal cult group primarily based in Japan. Members of Gorgom consist of both human and non-humans. The group is notorious for its terrorist activities in the name of world domination.

Creation King
The  is the almost omnipotent leader of Gorgom. He appears as a giant evil heart that communicates with the High Priests and the two Century Kings via telepathy. The Creation King also had monstrous strength that could destroy the entire universe. The Creation King pulled Kamen Rider Black away from where the Stickleback Mutant was attacking Whale Mutant. He made itself known to Kamen Rider Black and Shadow Moon. The Creation King then transported Black and Shadow Moon to the battle field to determine who will become his successor. After Shadow Moon was ultimately defeated, Black confronted the Creation King who threatened him to take the Kingstone from Shadow Moon's body unless he wants the Creation King to jump into the hole he created to lead him to the Earth's core and destroy it from within. The Creation King was killed by Black when the Satan Saber was stabbed into him.

In the series reboot, Kamen Rider Black Sun, the Creation King was originally a large Kamen Rider-like giant that was a product of Imperial Japan's superhuman experiments to create living weapons for military application. The Creation King's bodily fluids are used to both prolong Kaijin lives while converting humans into Kaijins, resulting in him being revered as a living deity. At the start of the series, the Creation King was dying before Kotaro rips out his heart in an attempt to kill the monster. However, the Creation King's heart survives before turning Kotaro into its host prior to being killed for good by Aoi Izumi.

High Priests
The  are second only to the Creation King, and they carry out his will. Setting up for his final battle with Kotaro, Shadow Moon sends the Grand Mutants to attack the city, overpowering the police as everyone runs out of Tokyo. Kotaro arrives to fight them all before they fallback, telling Kotaro he cannot stop the rise of Gorgom. Eventually, the three are killed off one by one.

In the series reboot, Kamen Rider Black Sun, the High Priests are leading members of the Gorgom Party who were forced to associate themselves with corrupt government officials for the sake of their race. But the group ceases to be with Darom and Baraom killed while Bishium survived and formed an alliance with the new prime minister Isao Nimura.

Darom
 is the leader of the High Priests, having a pale ancient face and able to manipulate others by pointing at them. In this form, he can discharge laser beams from his fingers and use his feelers like ropes. Following Baraom and Bishium's death, Darom attacked the ex-Shonen Warriors until Kotaro arrives and fights Darom until Shadow Moon arrives, killing Black and sending Darom to find his corpse to obtain the King Stone. Darom finds the Kujira Mutant's cave and learns that Kotaro had been revived. Darom and the Komori Mutant then had some Gorgom worshippers capture the Kujira Mutant as bait for Kotaro. After Black threw himself in front of the Kujira Mutant, he then used his King Stone Flash to deflect Darom's attack before killing him with the Rider Kick.

Baraom
 is one of the High Priests and has a stone-like green face. Baraom can discharge deadly laser beams from his robotic hands. He is usually in charge of the deployment of Gorgom's Mutants. In this form, Baraom can wield tusk-shaped weapons along with his natural abilities. After Bishium's destruction, Baraom trained himself to avenge her and even got the Kujira Mutant to help him. Baraom started to use his superhuman speed to overwhelm Black before the Kujira Mutant betrays him. Before succumbing to the Rider Kick, Baraom mentions that Shadow Moon will finish him off.

Bishium
 is a High Priestess having her face is divided between black and white, and a clear film covers most of her face. She can discharge laser beams from her eyes. In this form, she still has her usual powers and she can spin around to create twisters. When it came to the final confrontation with Black, she tried to get the King Stone from Kotaro by taking control of the mothers and capturing Kyoko. In the conflict, Bishium held Black so that Shadow Moon can shoot a beam that will rip out Kotaro's King Stone. It failed as Bishium is destroyed by that beam.

Bilgenia
 is the legendary warrior among the Gorgom clad in a birkenia-themed armor. Bilgenia was born 30,000 years ago on a day of the solar eclipse like Kotaro Minami and Nobuhiko Akizuki. However, the Creation King did not favor him and therefore did not give him a King Stone. He was then sealed in a coffin for almost trying to revolt against him. The three High Priests awakened him when the Creation King reprimanded them for not doing their job in killing Black, ordering them to release the curse on the coffin Bilgenia was imprisoned in. He was both a pain for Kamen Rider Black as well as to Gorgom. In episode 22, he turned his face white from 30,0000 years ago, making him more powerful and more arrogant. In episode 25, he had Yoichi Daimon's pupil Egami create the Hellshooter: an equivalent to Road Sector. He used it to challenge Kamen Rider Black and Road Sector only for the Hellshooter to be destroyed. During Gorgom's latest attempt to use Kyoko's life force to awaken Shadow Moon, Bilgenia stole the Satan Saber and attacked the High Priests before running off with Kyoko and going after Black to take his King Stone for himself. However, Kotaro and Kyoko manage to hide from Bilgenia as he decides to attack the city to flush Kotaro out by using his Satan Cross to cause anarchy with a group of young men. Arriving to the scene, Black battles Bilgenia until Shadow Moon finally awakens and he claims the Satan Saber, forcing Bilgenia to retreat as his influence wears off. Returning to the Gorgom shrine, Bilgenia fought Shadow Moon who disarmed and then killed him.

Mara and Kara
The Handmaiden Mutants were created by Shadow Moon and are high ranks than the Three High Priests, consists of the silvery  and the golden . Both handmaidens died during the collapse of Gorgom's base.

Human Members
Gorgom allows any humans to join them, making them appealing offers that include being made into Kaijins as they can live for 5,000 years. In the series reboot, Kamen Rider Black Sun, these humans are masterminds that oversaw the Kaijin experiment and embedded themselves within the government's ruling party with Gorgom subservient to them before Nobuhiko took over the party. Other than Soichiro Akizuki, these are the additional human members of Gorgom.

 : A scientist, Nobel Peace Prize winner, and Tohto University professor. He was Gorgom's chief scientist in converting humans (willing or not) into various mutants. He also has interchangeable hands for him to experiment on said humans, along with a cybernetic monocle that attaches over his right eye and back of his head. He uses his Tohto University job as a sanctuary for Gorgom's mutants and as a laboratory for conducting conversions for humans and for Mutant-related experiments. He was later killed for his repeated failures to eliminate Black with Bilgenia briefly assuming his appearance, after killing him.
 : A politician who used his political and non-political connections in performing tasks that Gorgom could not expose themselves into, such as kidnapping or assassination. He was responsible for leading a pro-Gorgom political party known as the EP Party with Omiya. His current status is unknown.
 : The head of Omiya Konzern, he used his business connections in finance Gorgom's criminal and terrorist activities. He is one of the EP Party's leaders with Sakata. His current status is unknown.
 : One of Japan's most famous actresses. She was assassinated by the Hyō Mutant when she unintentionally mentioned that Kotaro and Nobuhiko were becoming Century Kings on their 19th birthday party.
 : Believed to be a former JGSDF (Japanese Ground Self-Defense Forces) soldier, he uses his training to raise the Gorgom Destruction Team as a commando task force for Gorgom before Kotaro forced him to come to his senses.
 : A scientist who was recruited by Gorgom to create Road Sector before the High Priests gave orders for mass production for their plans of world conquest. Convinced that the bike should not be used for evil means, he hid it in a safe place. When Gorgom discovered it, they sent the Kōmori Mutant to kill him and Hotaru, wife of his son Akira Daimon. Akira hid in the mountains and trained his son Kenichi on how to ride a motorbike in order to master Road Sector. Akira gave possession of Road Sector to Black to use for the good of mankind after he defeated the Kamikiri Mutant and saved Kenichi from Baraom and the Koumori Mutant.
  (24): Katsumi's biology teacher in the university. As the Coelacanth Mutant, he can shoot electricity from its fingers, emit laser balls from his hands, and turn into an electrical ball. His research lab, known as the Takayama Research Laboratories, has an android staff and is where he takes the female college students he abducts to use his "Coelacanth DNA Injection" to turn them into female Gorgom soldiers. When Katsumi becomes the next target, Kotaro was attacked by Katsumi until he brought the Coelacanth Mutant out and escaped during the first battle with Katsumi in his clutches. With the help of some children (whom were really adults turned into children by de-aging medicine), Kotaro found the captive female college students just as Professor Takayama assumed his mutant form to a surprised Katsumi. The surviving kids got the captives out so Kotaro can fight. Once Kamen Rider BLACK destroyed Takayama/Coelacanth Mutant with the Rider Kick, the explosion destroyed Takayama Research Lab.

Shinichi Donami
An antagonist exclusive to Kamen Rider Black Sun,  is the Gorgom Party's human liaison and prime minister of Japan. Shinichi inherited his role from his grandfather, the previous prime minister who oversaw the Kaijin experiments during the Second World War. Having played an indirect role in his grandfather forcing the Three High Priests into serving under him when they kidnapped him as a teen during the 70s, Shinichi uses his connections in the present to abduct his country's undesirables for both Kaijin experimentation and exploitation. Eventually, forced to step down after his party and grandfather's ties to the Kaijin experiments were made public, Shinichi is murdered in an alleyway by Koumori and Nick.

Allies
 : The head of the Ishida Psychiatric Lab. He turned several kidnapped artists into psychics and sent them to infiltrate various corporations in order to conduct economic sabotage. After the Eagle Mutant was destroyed, it is assumed that he was arrested by the police for his role in the kidnappings.

Crisis Empire
They always attempted to justify their invasion and their plans to exterminate the human race. They also claimed that their home planet was being sucked into a black hole. Since they thought that humans do not really care about their planet, the Crisis Empire thought it was right for them to take over Earth. The group under Jark are based on the  battleship.

Used to be connected to Earth through dimensional portal in the distant peaceful past until the rise of Grand Lord Crisis. The portal were sealed off by the people of Kaima World who opposed the rule of the Emperor. With the dimensional connection severed, the two worlds drifted apart and the past was forgotten. The finale reveals that the kaima World is an exact 'mirror' world of Earth itself.

Grand Lord Crisis blames the dying of their world as an effect coming from the pollution of Earth's environment by mankind, contradicting Professor Walter's explanation that the world's condition was caused by the evil ways of the Crisis Emperor. In the end of the battle, Grand Lord Crisis claimed that as long as mankind lives on "the pollution they caused", there would always be another Kaima World. - hinting the possible existence of parallel worlds. His death causes the Kaima World to explode as well.

Emperor Crisis
 is the ruling dictator of the Crisis Empire, a giant head with tendrils and three small faces on his forehead, who is not seen but mentioned several times throughout the series yet based on Crisis City at the Empire's home world. His voice was first heard where Gedorian eventually appeased his wrath, later appearing in the shadows to give General Jark the power he requested to have. He eventually offered Black RX the chance to become his new right hand by offering him Earth. When refused, Crisis has host body Dasmader kill him, upon finally revealing himself upon his host's demise. He was destroyed by RX's Revolcane, with his dimension ceasing to exist as a result while claiming his immorality ensured his return as long as evil exists.

General Jark
 is a military leader of the empire and supreme commander of the invasion army. Wearing a golden face mask and a black cape, Jark has the loyalty of most under him as he initially leading the attacks until Crisis arrived. He actually does care about his subordinates even to save Maribaron from being killed by Dasmader. Towards the end of the series, he was forcefully transformed by Crisis into a stronger warrior called  to kill RX. In the process, Jark Midla easily murdered the Sahara parents and defeated V3 and Riderman while X and Amazon rescued the Sahara children from his grasp. When he was in the middle of battle, the Sahara kids attacked him before RX as RoboRider shielded them and transformed into BioRider. After Dasmader abandoned him for his failures, he was killed by RX using his Revolcane. Regressed to his normal form and near death, he proclaimed Crisis was too powerful even for RX.

Four Officers
The  are Jark's four followers who carry out the attacks on Earth.

Maribaron
 is the sorceress of the State, a human-looking officer in black and red armor from a noble family outside the Crisisians with feelings for Jark. She uses the yellow feather on her helmet as a weapon or to send messages, along with using a laser whip and breathe fire. She cares for her comrades, displaying it when Lord Crisis' living heir Garonia dies in a freak accident on their watch and she attempts to cover it up by kidnapping Hitomi to take her place. Though Jark learned the truth, he allows Maribaron to take the girl to the Miraculous Valley to complete her plan. But when Kotaro saves Hitomi, Maribaron is advised by Jark to make a false report that the princess was killed by Black RX. When Granzyrus arrives, Maribaron revived the spirits of 10 soldiers Kotaro killed to finish off the other riders. She was eventually shocked to learn that Dasmader was Grand Lord Crisis' mobile body, killed by Crisis when she objected on his decision to have Black RX join them after all the trouble he caused them.

Bosgun
 is a Crisisian dressed in a blue-green naval coat and white tights who wields a jagged sword and dagger. He wears a white helmet with a red visor and a tiny face on his forehead, which seems to be his actual face. He is in charge of the Man-Beast/Mutant unit, occasionally flaunting his Crisisian heritage to the other officers as he sees them to be inferior to him. He once plotted to take over General Jark but his plans were foiled when one of his swords was destroyed by General Jark himself upon discovering his treachery when he lost to RX twice. He died fighting when he was stabbed by the Revolcane during the arrival of Granzyrus.

Gatezone
 is a blue robotic biker in a leather jacket, slack, and one red eye on his face. In charge of the Robot unit, he took to fight Black RX occasionally. He is armed with a blaster and a powerful motorcycle called Storm Dagger. Gatenzone had the ability to detach his own head from his body. His body could still move on its own without his head. In his final episode, He died fighting Black RX while attempting a suicide bomb (with his head separated from his body) attack, with only his head remaining before it was shattered by his own laser beams reflected by Black RX.

Gedorian
 is a small, unusual creature who owed his life to Jark and is one of his most loyal minions. He is constantly hopping about and annoying everyone else. He is the most cowardly and is quick to ditch a battle before it's even over. He was soon targeted by Dasmader, Gatezone and Bosgun when Grand Lord Crisis was about to destroy them all, but he soon gave his life to ensure the others avoid Crisis' wrath when he transferred his life energy into Gedolridol before his monster died at Black RX's hands.

Colonel Dasmader
Sent by Lord Crisis,  is an inspector whose task is to put the invasion party back on track, receiving utter contempt by his peers due to his arrogance. Dasmader could fire a green laser, with a shape of a tiger's head from his helmet for combat. He was almost killed by both General Jark and Black RX. He later leads Gatezawn and Bosgun in the attempt to kill Gedorian to appease Crisis' anger. In episode 46, Maribaron discovers that he is somewhat a puppet of Crisis and a mobile body. In episode 47, he was summoned when Black RX refused Crisis' order, killed as a resort as Crisis is revealed upon Dasmader's demise.

Others
 : A small robot that announces Jark's arrival before his subordinates and transmits messages from Crisis himself. He was destroyed by Kamen Rider Black RX before the final battle with Dasmader.
 : The Crisis Empire's foot soldiers. They come in three colors: gray, brown and black. They later wear capes for the final four episodes of the series. The last of them were finished by the original 10 Kamen Riders before Black RX battles Dasmader.
 : An eagle-like monster which was the Grand Lord Crisis' best soldier and worked with Bosgan when summoned to Earth. The 10 veteran Kamen Rider team arrived to help fight Granzyrus. After killing Bosgan, RX became BioRider upon being doused by the water summoned by Kyoko. BioRider turned into water and rode the water summoned by Kyoko into Granzyrus. Once inside, BioRider brought out his BioBlade and destroyed the monster from the inside out.

Black Characters
Kamen Rider Black
Kamen Rider Black
Kamen Rider Black